Michael Zulli is an American artist known for his work as an animal and wildlife illustrator and as a comic book illustrator.

Career
Michael Zulli's career in the comics industry began in October 1986 with The Puma Blues, on which he collaborated with writer Stephen Murphy. The monthly title was published by Dave Sim's Aardvark One International and later by Mirage Studios. Zulli illustrated the characters, wildlife and natural landscapes in the polluted post-industrial environment of the story's not-too-distant future. The ecological warnings of the series put forward an argument for natural conservation and against the abuse and pollution of the natural environment. The series was published for 23 issues and a mini-comic half issue, ending in 1989.

Between 1990 and 1991, Zulli created three issues of the Teenage Mutant Ninja Turtles: #31 ("Soul's Winter") #35 ("Soul's Withering"), and #36 ("Soul's End"). His dark and uniquely realistic interpretation of the TMNT entitled the "Soul's Trilogy" was a polarizing one among fans of the series. Zulli wrote, drew, and painted the covers for the 3 issues. The work has been viewed as a classic series in hindsight and collected by IDW as "Soul's Winter."

He drew a never-published issue of DC Comics' Swamp Thing in which the title character meets Jesus Christ. In the 1990s another unfinished and unpublished story, Sweeney Todd, written by Neil Gaiman and illustrated by Zulli for Stephen R. Bissette's publication Taboo was stopped when the anthology itself was discontinued. By this time, Zulli had received the attention of many writers, editors and artists in the comics industry. In 1990 he guest pencilled issue #13 of DC Comics' nascent Vertigo series The Sandman written by Gaiman. This story introduced the Hob Gadling character. Zulli would illustrate seven Sandman issues including the final Sandman story arc "The Wake". Zulli and Gaiman collaborated on a comics adaptation of Alice Cooper's The Last Temptation in 1994. After The Sandman series ended, he had a gallery show called "Visions of the Wake" in New York City. He also began illustrating for several newer Vertigo imprint titles including Winter's Edge, Witchcraft: La Terreur and Sandman Presents: Love Street. He was one of the artists on the Shade limited series which spun off from the Starman series.

Comics bibliography

1986–1988: The Puma Blues #1–19 – penciller/inker (Aardvark One International)
1988–1989: The Puma Blues #20–23, mini-comic - penciller/inker (Mirage Studios)
1988: Teenage Mutant Ninja Turtles #31, 35–36 - writer/penciller/inker (Mirage Studios)
1989: Taboo #2 – writer/penciller/inker (Spiderbaby Grafix)
1990: The Sandman #13 – penciller (DC Comics)
1990: Taboo #4 – penciller/inker (Spiderbaby Grafix)
1991: Taboo #5 – writer/penciller (Spiderbaby Grafix)
1991: Tundra Sketchbook Series #3 – penciller (Tundra Publishing)
1992: Legends of Arzach #2 – penciller (Tundra Publishing, Ltd.)
1992: Taboo #6 – penciller (Spiderbaby Grafix)
1992: Taboo #7 – penciller/inker (Spiderbaby Grafix)
1993: Angels and Visitations – penciller/inker (Vertigo)
1993: Guest of Honor – penciller (no publisher)
1994: A Death Gallery #1 – penciller/inker (Vertigo)
1994: The Sandman #50 – penciller/inker (Vertigo)
1994: Roarin' Rick's Rarebit Friends #8–9 – penciller/inker (King Hell)
1994: Starman #3 – penciller/inker (DC Comics)
1994: Alice Cooper: The Last Temptation #1–3 – penciller/inker (Marvel Comics/Marvel Music)
1994: The Staros Report #2 – penciller (Star House)
1994: Witchcraft #4 – penciller/inker (Vertigo)
1994: Turtle Soup #4 – penciller/inker (Mirage Studios)
1995: The Sandman #53 – penciller (Vertigo)
1995: Witchblade #47 - penciller/inker (Top Cow Productions/Image Comics)
1996: The Dreaming #8 – penciller/inker (Vertigo)
1996: The Sandman #70–72 – penciller (issues were not inked) (Vertigo)
1996: Seekers into the Mystery #6–9 – penciller/inker (Vertigo)
1997: Destiny: A Chronicle of Deaths Foretold #1 – penciller/inker (Vertigo)
1997: The Shade #4 – penciller/inker (DC Comics)
1998: Vertigo: Winter's Edge #3 – penciller/inker (Vertigo)
1998: Witchcraft: La Terreur #1–3 – penciller/inker (Vertigo)
1998: Longshot: Fools – penciller (Marvel Comics)
1999: Batman: No Man's Land #1 – penciller (DC Comics)
1999: Star Wars Tales #13 – penciller/inker (Dark Horse Comics)
1999: Webspinners: Tales of Spider-Man #1–3 – penciller/inker (Marvel Comics)
2000: The Quotable Sandman – penciller (Vertigo)
2000: The Sandman Presents: Love Street #1–3 – penciller (Vertigo)
2000: Vertigo Secret Files and Origins: Swamp Thing #1 – penciller/inker (Vertigo)
2000–2001: Legends of the DC Universe #33–36 – penciller (DC Comics)
2001: Delicate Creatures – penciller/inker (Image Comics/Top Cow Productions)
2002: 9-11: The World's Finest Comic Book Writers & Artists Tell Stories to Remember, Volume Two – penciller/inker (DC Comics)
2002: Grendel: Red, White and Black #4 - penciller (Vertigo)
2004: Creatures of the Night – penciller/inker/painter (Dark Horse Comics)
2007: The Facts in the Case of the Departure of Miss Finch – penciller/inker/painter (Dark Horse Comics)
2011: The Fracture of the Universal Boy – writer/penciller/inker
2015: The Puma Blues: The Complete Saga in One Volume collects The Puma Blues #1–23 with a new 40-page conclusion – penciller/inker (Dover Publications)

Awards and nominations
 Eisner Award
1996 Nominated for Best Serialized Story (with Neil Gaiman for "The Wake", in The Sandman #70–72)
 1996 Nominated for Best Best Penciller/Inker (for "The Wake")
 1996 Nominated for Best Comics-Related Item (for Sandman: The Wake poster)

References

External links

 Michael Zulli at Mike's Amazing World of Comics
 Michael Zulli at the Unofficial Handbook of Marvel Comics Creators

Year of birth missing (living people)
20th-century American artists
21st-century American artists
American comics artists
American comics writers
American people of Italian descent
Comics inkers
DC Comics people
Living people
Marvel Comics people
Mirage Studios